Thomas Gardner (17 March 1923 – 7 November 2016) was an English footballer who played as a winger.

Gardner made one appearance for Everton in the 1947–48 season before being forced to retire through injury.

Gardner died on 7 November 2016 at the age of 93. He was Everton's oldest surviving player at the time of his death.

References

1923 births
2016 deaths
Footballers from Liverpool
English footballers
Association football wingers
South Liverpool F.C. (1890s) players
Liverpool F.C. players
Everton F.C. players